Stuart Thomas Fraser (born 9 January 1980) is a Scottish footballer.

Fraser started his career at Luton Town, making his debut at the end of the 1997–98 season. He scored his first and only goal for the club in September 1999 in a 4–2 win against Oxford United. Fraser was a regular in the starting lineup at the start of the 2000–01 season, and earned himself a callup to the Scotland under-21 national team. In January 2001, Fraser suffered a broken leg in an FA Cup match against Queen's Park Rangers. He failed to regain his place in the first team and was released in March 2002. He made a total of 44 league appearances for the club.

Following a short trial with Dundee United, he signed for Stevenage Borough. He made his debut against Morecambe, making 31 appearances for the club before moving on to Arniston Rangers in the Scottish Junior League. He signed for Berwick Rangers in 2006, He won the Scottish Third Division with Berwick during his first season at the club, but after suffering another broken leg in the following season he barely featured for the team again. In 2009, he moved to Musselburgh Athletic.

References

External links

1980 births
Scottish footballers
Luton Town F.C. players
English Football League players
Stevenage F.C. players
Berwick Rangers F.C. players
Living people
Arniston Rangers F.C. players
Scottish Football League players
Scotland under-21 international footballers
Musselburgh Athletic F.C. players
Association football defenders
Footballers from Edinburgh